BloodRayne is a 2005 German-American fantasy action horror film set in 18th-century Romania, directed by Uwe Boll. The film stars Kristanna Loken, Michael Madsen, Matthew Davis, Will Sanderson, Billy Zane, Udo Kier, Michael Paré, Meat Loaf, Michelle Rodriguez, Ben Kingsley, and Geraldine Chaplin. The screenplay by Guinevere Turner is based on the video game of the same name from Majesco Entertainment and the game developer, Terminal Reality.

The third video game film adaptation by Boll, who previously made the films based on House of the Dead and Alone in the Dark, BloodRayne received extremely negative reviews upon release and was a box office bomb, grossing only $3.7 million from a $25 million budget.

Plot

Rayne is an unholy breed of human and vampire known as a dhampir. Dhampirs are unaffected by crucifixes and do not thirst for human blood but maintain a vampire weakness to holy water. She is the daughter of the Vampire King, Kagan, who has gathered an army of thralls, both vampire and human, in order to annihilate the human race. She was conceived when Kagan raped her mother, and she later witnessed him killing her when she refused to give him Rayne as a girl.

Sebastian, Vladimir, and Katarin are three members of the Brimstone Society, a group of warriors sworn to fight vampires. They hear of a carnival freak who may be a dhampir, so Vladimir plans to recruit her in order to kill Kagan. Kagan is also hunting for her, fearing she will interfere with his plans. Rayne escapes captivity at the carnival when her keeper tries to rape her. On the road, she encounters and saves a family being attacked by vampires. A fortune teller reveals to Rayne that Kagan has become the most powerful vampire in the land and resides in a well-protected castle. She tells Rayne that Kagan seeks an ancient talisman, a mystical eye, and if she finds it, it will allow her to gain an audience with him. Rayne sets out to the monastery, where it is hidden, to find it.

Rayne shelters for the night at the monastery and later sneaks away to where the talisman is guarded by a hammer-wielding, deformed monk, who she kills. Booby traps further protect the talisman, and when Rayne lifts it from its pedestal, the chamber floods with holy water. As Rayne hangs from the ceiling to avoid the water, the talisman falls from the box, but she catches the eyeball. Examining it closely, the eye magically becomes absorbed into her own eye, and when she falls into the water, she is somehow unaffected by it.

When she leaves the chamber, the monks explain the artifact is one of three body parts which came from an ancient vampire called Belial, who had found a way to overcome the weaknesses of a vampire. The eye overcomes holy water, the rib overcomes the cross, and the heart overcomes sunlight. When Belial died, the parts of his body were hidden across the land. As Kagan desires all these parts in order to assume Belial's powers, it becomes the heroes' mission to stop him.

Rayne is brought to the headquarters of the Brimstone Society and they agree to work together to kill Kagan. Katarin does not trust Rayne and betrays Brimstone to her father, Elrich, who has fallen in league with Kagan, but seeks to betray him and gain power for himself. The location of the heart talisman is known to Katarin as her grandfather hid it in water-filled caves. She seeks it out but Rayne kills her and takes it. With the talisman, Rayne attempts to gain an audience before Kagan, but he takes the heart and throws her in the dungeon. He plans to extract the eye as part of a ritual. He realizes too late that Rayne had only given him an empty box and not the heart.

Sebastian and Vladimir intervene, battling Kagan and his minions, but both are fatally wounded, leaving Rayne in a final battle against Kagan. As Sebastian dies, he fires a final bolt from his crossbow, but Kagan is too quick and is able to catch it. Rayne is able to summon her last reserves of strength and plunge the bolt into his heart. The battle ends, and Sebastian chooses to die rather than let Rayne save him. Rayne sits on Kagan's throne and reflects on the events that led to her father's death. She then leaves the castle and rides off into the mountains.

Cast

Production
Screenwriter Guinevere Turner turned in the first draft two weeks late. Rather than ask for redrafts, Boll accepted it and then made many of his own changes; and he then asked the actors to "take a crack at it". Turner estimated only 20% of her script was actually filmed.

Filming took place in Romania, in the Carpathian Mountains. Filming also took place in a castle where Prince Vlad the Impaler presumably spent a night once.

Reception
The film opened in 985 theaters across the United States on 6 January 2006. It was originally to have played at up to 2,500 theaters, but that number dropped to 1,600 and ended up lower due to prints being shipped to theaters that had not licensed the film.

Billy Zane was involved with distributor Romar Entertainment and Uwe Boll later sued him for revenue owed.

Box office
In its opening, the film only made US$1,550,000.
The film ended up grossing US$3,591,980 (June 2006) against a production budget of US$25 million.

Critical response

BloodRayne was critically negatively received. The site's consensus reads: "BloodRayne is an absurd sword-and-sorcery vid-game adaptation from schlock-maestro Uwe Boll, featuring a distinguished (and slumming) cast." It was ranked 48th in Rotten Tomatoes's 100 worst reviewed films of the 2000s. On Metacritic it has a weighted average score of 18% based on 13 reviews, summarizing the reviews as "overwhelming dislike".

Joe Leydon of Variety said that the film "lurches from incident to incident at a graceless plodding place, offering little in the way of genuine excitement—the swordfights often are confusingly cut and choreographed—and only minimal amounts of guilty-pleasure titillation". 
Maitland McDonagh of TV Guide wrote: "Though indisputably the best of Uwe Boll's first three video-game-into-film adaptations, this gory, ludicrous horror-action picture isn't good by any standard".
Critics ridiculed Boll for hiring actual prostitutes instead of actors for a scene featuring Meat Loaf in order to save on production costs.

Some critics were more forgiving of the film. Berge Garabedian of JoBlo's movie reviews described as the film as "actually pretty decent .. for what it is", namely a video game adaptation, with a hot lead actress in the form of Kristanna Loken and a number of surprisingly fun and bloody action sequences. He acknowledges the dialog is poor and the story lame but says the film is "not as bad as you'd suspect" and an adequate, bloody, low-budget vampire film.
Steve Chupnick of the Latino Review gave the film a B rating, saying that although it was not a good film, it was far from the worst he's seen and mentioned the Kristanna Loken nude scene as something in the film's favor.

Actor Michael Madsen called BloodRayne "an abomination ... a horrifying and preposterous movie", but added that he enjoyed working with Boll and would certainly work with him again if asked. Laura Bailey, who was the voice of Rayne in the BloodRayne games, was asked at her panel at Anime Boston 2007 what her thoughts were on the film adaptation, and said: "Oh God, that movie sucked. And that movie was so bad. I saw it on The Movie Channel and I couldn't even get through 20 minutes of it! It was so bad and it was kinda sad that they took that because I really liked the games". Guinevere Turner, who wrote the draft screenplay, found the film laughable and suggested that it was the "worst movie ever made" but that it was so camp it might ripen with age.

Accolades

The film was nominated for six Golden Raspberry Awards including, Worst Picture, Worst Actress (Kristanna Loken), Worst Supporting Actor (Ben Kingsley), Worst Supporting Actress (Michelle Rodriguez), Worst Director, and Worst Screenplay. Bloodrayne did not win any, having been dominated by Basic Instinct 2 and Little Man with seven nominations each.

At the 2006 Stinkers Bad Movie Awards, it received nine nominations, trailing behind Zoom ten, with four wins: Worst Picture, Worst Director (Boll), Worst Ensemble, and Least "Special" Special Effects. Its other nominations were for Worst Supporting Actor (Meatloaf Aday), Worst Supporting Actress (Rodriguez), Worst Screenplay, Most Annoying Fake Female Fake Accent (Rodriguez), and Least Scary Horror Movie.

In 2009, Time listed the film #6 on their list of top ten worst video games movies.

The film was number one on GameTrailers countdown of the worst video game movies ever. The reviewers from GameTrailers said that "every actor is miscast, every wig is too fake, every sex scene is too inappropriate, and every action scene is too improvised".

Sequels

A sequel, BloodRayne 2: Deliverance, was released in 2007. Natassia Malthe replaced Loken in the lead role. Due to the poor box office of the first film, BloodRayne 2: Deliverance went direct-to-video instead. A third film, BloodRayne: The Third Reich was released in 2011. Malthe reprised her role as Rayne. Both sequels were directed by Uwe Boll. Michael Paré appeared in all three films, but as different characters: Iancu, Pat Garrett, and Commandant Ekart Brand, respectively.

Home media

Before the DVD of this film was released, Boll removed the Romar name and logo from the credits and packaging of this film. As a result, Romar ceased distributing the film. In addition to the R-rated version which was shown in cinemas, a more violent unrated director's cut including an extended ending was released on DVD. The director's cut DVD box set included a full copy of the BloodRayne 2 video game on the second DVD.

See also
 List of films based on video games

References

External links
 
 

2005 films
2000s action horror films
2005 horror films
American action horror films
American monster movies
American satirical films
American splatter films
BloodRayne films
Brightlight Pictures films
Films set in the 18th century
German horror films
2000s English-language films
English-language German films
Gothic horror films
Films directed by Uwe Boll
Films set in castles
Films shot in Romania
Live-action films based on video games
2000s monster movies
Romar Entertainment films
American vampire films
American supernatural horror films
American films about revenge
German films about revenge
German monster movies
2000s exploitation films
German splatter films
2000s American films
2000s German films
German vampire films